The GAA Hurling Under-20 All-Ireland Championship (known for sponsorship reasons as the Bord Gáis Energy GAA Hurling Under-20 All-Ireland Championship) is an annual inter-county hurling competition organised by the Gaelic Athletic Association (GAA). It is the highest inter-county hurling competition for male players between the ages of 17 and 20 in Ireland. The championship was contested as the All-Ireland Under-21 Championship between 1964 and 2018 before changing to an under-20 age category from 2019.

The final, currently held on the fourth Sunday in August, serves as the culmination of a series of games played during the summer months, and the results determine which team receives the James Nowlan Cup. The All-Ireland Championship had always been played on a straight knockout basis whereby once a team loses they are eliminated from the championship, however, as of 2018 the qualification procedures for the championship have changed. Currently, qualification is limited to teams competing in the Leinster Championship and the Munster Championship.

Four teams currently participate in the All-Ireland Championship, with the most successful teams coming from the province of Munster. Teams representing this province have won a total of 32 All-Ireland titles.

The title has been won by 8 different teams, 7 of whom have won the title more than once. The all-time record-holders are Cork, who have won the championship on 13 occasions. Kilkenny are the current holders.

History

Creation

Since 1962, the Munster Council had been organising a provincial championship for under-21 players in Gaelic football. This championship proved successful in bridging the gap between the minor and senior grades in a way in which the junior championship had failed to do. At the GAA's annual Congress in April 1963, the Kerry County Board introduced a successful motion in favour of extending the provincial championship to All-Ireland level. It was the fifth All-Ireland championship to be created after the corresponding championships in senior (1887), junior (1912), minor (1928) and intermediate (1961).

Beginnings

The inaugural All-Ireland Championship in 1964 used a provincial format. 16 teams contested the respective championships in Leinster and Munster, with Tiobraid Árann and Loch Garman emerging as the respective champions. Ros Comáin and Aontroim were the respective unopposed representatives from Connacht and Ulster.

Antrim and Wexford contested the very first championship match on Sunday 2 August 1964 at Casement Park, Belfast. The inaugural All-Ireland final took place on 4 October 1964, with Tiobraid Árann defeating Loch Garman to take the title.

Proposed changes

In 2008 a radical motion was brought before a special Congress in an effort to combat player burnout. It was proposed to merge the existing under-21 and minor championships to create a new All-Ireland Under-19 Hurling Championship. This motion was defeated by 115 votes to 58.

A similar motion was later introduced in an effort to lower the age and create a new All-Ireland Under-20 Championship, however, this motion was also defeated.

Development

Like the corresponding championships at senior and minor levels, Leinster and Munster teams grew to become the most dominant, as Gaelic football was the more dominant sport in Ulster and Connacht. After leaving the Munster Championship in 1970, Galway became the only credible team in Connacht and was essentially given an automatic pass to the All-Ireland semi-final every year.

After the introduction of the "back door" system in the senior and minor championships in 1997, the under-21 championship remained as the last true straight knock-out championship. This changed following a Central Council motion to alter the format of the championship was endorsed by a Special Congress on 30 September 2017. The proposal to allow Galway and Ulster teams as agreed by the Leinster and Ulster Councils into the Leinster Championship was backed by 72% of delegates. The original recommendation would have ended All-Ireland semi-finals as the Munster winners were set to face off against the Leinster victors from next year. However, Cork argued that they should be retained with the Munster champions taking on the runners-up in Leinster and vice versa. Their idea was endorsed by 78% of delegates. The new format was used for the first time in 2018.

At the GAA Congress on 24 February 2018, the age limit of the championship was changed to twenty, following a successful motion by the Offaly County Board. In contrast to Gaelic football, under-20 hurlers were also eligible to play both under-20 and senior hurling for their county. This provision was abolished at the 2020 GAA Congress. The "back door system" for the defeated provincial finalists was also permanently abolished, having been suspended in 2020 due to the COVID-19 pandemic.

Format

Qualification

Championship

There are four teams in the All-Ireland Championship. During the course of a championship season three games are played comprising two semi-finals and a final. The championship is played as a single-elimination tournament. Each game is played as a single leg.

Venues

Attendances

Stadium attendances are a significant source of regular income for the GAA and for the teams involved. For the 2017 championship, the average attendances for the three games was 7,336 with a total aggregate attendance figure of 22,009.

Semi-finals

The All-Ireland semi-finals have been played exclusively at Semple Stadium in Thurles since 2011. Both semi-finals are usually played on the same day as part of a double-header of games. Semple Stadium had been regularly used as a semi-final venue prior to this, however, a number of other stadiums around the country were also used. Páirc Esler in Newry and Páirc Tailteann in Navan were regularly used for semi-finals involving a Leinster-Ulster pairing. Parnell Park in Dublin was used on a number of occasions for Munster-Ulster clashes, while O'Connor Park in Tullamore was a regular venue for Connacht-Munster and Connacht-Leinster meetings.

Final

Since 2010, Semple Stadium in Thurles has been the regular venue for the All-Ireland final. Prior to this, Semple Stadium had hosted the All-Ireland final on 12 previous occasions. Other stadiums which hosted the All-Ireland final include Walsh Park (8 times), Croke Park (7 times), Nowlan Park (5 times), Gaelic Grounds (5 times) and O'Connor Park (3 times).

Trophy and medals

At the end of the All-Ireland final, the winning team is presented with a trophy. The cup is held by the winning team until the following year's final. Traditionally, the presentation is made at a special rostrum in stand where GAA and political dignitaries and special guests view the match.

The cup is decorated with ribbons in the colours of the winning team. During the game the cup actually has both teams' sets of ribbons attached and the runners-up ribbons are removed before the presentation. The winning captain accepts the cup on behalf of his team before giving a short speech. Individual members of the winning team then have an opportunity to come to the rostrum to lift the cup.
The trophy is known as the Cross of Cashel, probably the most unique looking trophy awarded by the GAA. Awarded for the first time in 1967, a spectacular cast bronze trophy modelled on the ancient Celtic cross found at the rock of Cashel in Co Tipperary, it is a tall narrow and quiet heavy trophy with a square bronze base holding a cross depicting the crucifixion of Jesus. P. J. Ryan of Tipperary was the first recipient. After nearly 50 years the trophy was retired for undisclosed reasons following the conclusion of the 2015 championship. Diarmaid Byrnes of Limerick was the last captain to receive the trophy.

In 2016 the GAA purchased a second hand English soccer cup in London and renamed it the James Nowlan Cup. Born in Monasterevin, James Nowlan became the first Chairman of the Leinster Council in 1900. He was elected President of the GAA in 1901, serving in that position until 1921. As the longest-serving president, Nowlan was honoured as the GAA's only Honorary Life President.

In accordance with GAA rules, the Central Council awards up to twenty-four gold medals to the winners of the All-Ireland final.

Sponsorship

Since 2003, the All-Ireland Championship has been sponsored. The sponsor has usually been able to determine the championship's sponsorship name.

Finals Listed By Year

Wins Listed By County

Performances by province

A representative of each of the four provinces of Ireland have made an appearance in the final match of the All-Ireland.

To date, Munster leads with 36 titles, followed by Leinster with 14 titles and Connacht with 10 titles. A team from Ulster has made the championship final just once, but was defeated by a Munster side.

Records and statistics

By decade
The most successful team of each decade, judged by number of All-Ireland Under-21 and Under-20 Hurling Championship titles, is as follows:

 1960s: 3 for Cork (1966-68-69)
 1970s: 4 for Cork (1970-71-73-76)
 1980s: 4 for Tipperary (1980-81-85-89)
 1990s: 3 each for Kilkenny (1990-94-99) and Galway (1991-93-96)
 2000s: 4 for Kilkenny (2003-04-06-08)
 2010s: 3 for Clare (2012-13-14) and Tipperary (2010-18-19)
 2020s: 2 so far for Cork (2020-21)

Gaps

Longest gaps between successive All-Ireland titles:
 24 years: Waterford (1992-2016)
 22 years: Cork (1998-2020)
 15 years: Tipperary (1995-2010)
 14 years: Kilkenny (2008-2022)
 13 years: Limerick (1987-2000)
 13 years: Limerick (2002-2015)
 12 years: Tipperary (1967-1979)
 9 years: Cork (1988-1997)
 8 years: Tipperary (2010-2018)

Top scorers

In finals

See also

 List of All-Ireland Under-20 Hurling Championship winners

References

External links
 Official GAA website

 
All-Ireland inter-county hurling championships